The 2012 United States Senate election in Nevada was held on Tuesday, November 6, 2012, concurrently with elections to the United States Senate in other states as well as elections to the United States House of Representatives and the 2012 presidential election. The primary election was held June 12, 2012.

Incumbent Republican U.S. Senator Dean Heller, who was appointed to his seat in May 2011 following the resignation of Senator John Ensign, was narrowly elected to his first full term over Representative Shelley Berkley, despite President Barack Obama carrying the state by 6.7% in the concurrent presidential election. As a result, Heller became the only Republican Senate candidate in 2012 to win in a state that was lost by the Republican presidential candidate. With a margin of 1.2%, this election was the second-closest race of the 2012 Senate election cycle, behind only the election in North Dakota. , this was the last time the Republicans won a U.S. Senate election in Nevada.

Background 

Ensign was reelected to the United States Senate in 2006 against Jack Carter, son of former president Jimmy Carter, by a margin of 55–41%. His reelection campaign was expected to be complicated after it was revealed in 2009 that he had been involved in an extramarital affair with the wife of one of his campaign staffers, allegedly made payments to the woman's family and arranged work for her husband to cover himself.

The Senate Ethics Committee was to investigate Ensign, and his poll numbers declined significantly. There was speculation that he might resign before the election, but he initially said he would run for reelection. On March 7, 2011, Ensign announced that he would not seek reelection, and on April 22, he announced that he would resign effective May 3.

Nevada Governor Brian Sandoval appointed U.S. Representative Dean Heller to fill the vacancy created by Ensign's resignation. Heller took office on May 9, 2011.

Republican primary

Candidates 
 Sherry Brooks, retired secretary
 Richard Charles
 Eddie Hamilton, retired auto executive and perennial candidate
 Dean Heller, incumbent U.S. Senator, former U.S. Representative, former Nevada Secretary of State and former state assemblyman
 Carlo Poliak, sanitation worker and perennial candidate
 David Lory Vanderbeek, marriage and family therapist

Declined 
 Sharron Angle, 2010 Republican Senate nominee and former state assemblywoman
 John Ensign, former U.S. Senator
 Brian Krolicki, lieutenant governor

Polling 

Primary

Appointment preference

Primaries with Ensign

Results

Democratic primary

Candidates 
 Shelley Berkley, U.S. Representative
 Steve Brown, businessman
 Barry Ellsworth, renewable energy executive
 Louis Macias, art dealer
 Nancy Price, former Regent of the Nevada System of Higher Education and Democratic nominee for the 2nd congressional district in 2010

Withdrew 
 Byron Georgiou, businessman

Polling

Results

General election

Candidates 
 Shelley Berkley (D), U.S. Representative
 Dean Heller (R), incumbent U.S. Senator
 David Lory VanDerBeek (Independent American Party of Nevada), therapist

Debates 
The first Berkley-Heller debate was on September 27, 2012. They met again in Las Vegas on October 11 and on Jon Ralston's "Face to Face" program on October 15.
External links
Complete video of debate, September 27, 2012 - C-SPAN
Complete video of debate, October 11, 2012 - C-SPAN

Fundraising

Top contributors

Top industries

Predictions

Polling 

Shelly Berkley vs. Dean Heller
 

with John Ensign

Results

See also 
 2012 United States Senate elections
 2012 United States House of Representatives elections in Nevada

References

External links 
 Election Center at the Nevada secretary of state
 Campaign contributions at OpenSecrets.org
 Outside spending at Sunlight Foundation
 Candidate issue positions at On the Issues
Official campaign sites
 Shelley Berkley for Senate
 Dean Heller for Senate
 David Lory Vanderbeek for Senate

Nevada
2012
2012 Nevada elections